Fraochaidh (879 m) is a mountain in the Grampian Mountains, located between Glen Coe and Oban on the west coast of Scotland. It lies on the border of Highland and Argyll and Bute.

A steep sided mountain, many of its approaches are covered in thick forest plantations. The best route to the summit is from the Glen Coe side to its north.

References

Mountains and hills of Highland (council area)
Mountains and hills of Argyll and Bute
Marilyns of Scotland
Corbetts